Honkai: Star Rail is an upcoming free-to-play 3D role-playing video game developed and published by HoYoverse. It is the fourth installment in the Honkai series, using brand new characters along with alternate versions of existing characters  from Honkai Impact 3rd.

It was officially revealed on October 7, 2021, on the game's official YouTube channel.

Etymology
The "Star Rail" mentioned in the title refers to an interstellar train featured in the game, while Honkai is the main antagonistic force of the Honkai series, which seeks to destroy civilizations as they advance. The word honkai is derived from Japanese 崩壊 (rōmaji: hōkai), meaning decay or destruction.

Gameplay
Honkai: Star Rail has players control a team of up to four characters, which make up a team. Elements of open-world and dungeon exploration are present, with focus being on turn-based strategic combat.

Story

Plot 
After the events of Honkai Impact 3rd, Welt Yang travels to a parallel universe to embark on his own journey.

The story begins when two crew members of the Astral Express, March 7th and Dan Heng are delivering rare relics to Herta, the master of the Herta Space Station. Suddenly, Voidrangers of the Antimatter Legion ambush the Space Station and start attacking people. Luckily, March and Dan as well lead researcher Asta and head security Arlan were able fend them off.

Unbeknownst to them, two Stellaron Hunters, Kafka and Silver Wolf snuck into the Space Station and used its chaos as a distraction to steal a Stellaron by order of their leader Elio who can see into the future. After finding the Stellaron, they use it to create an artificial human dubbed the "Trailblazer" and insert the Stellaron into their body. Upon opening their eyes, Kafka tells them about Elio foreseeing their future about their journey and finding friends before leaving the Trailblazer behind in order to set up meeting with the Astral Express.

March and Dan later find the Trailblazer unconscious and bring them along to find Arlan. They manage to find him, but are suddenly ambushed by a Trampler and its fellow Voidrangers. Himeko, with the help of her drone, manages to save the group who later meet Asta and explain the current situation. Soon after, a huge monster of the Legion dubbed a "Doomsday Beast" tears open the Herta Space Station's shield. Asta orders the others to escape while she chooses to stay.

The Astral Express crew and the Trailblazer manage to escape, and as they reach the Platform, the Doomsday Beast ambushes them but is swiftly defeated. The beast, however, unleashes its power putting March 7th in danger, but the Trailbazer shields her. The Trailblazer sees a vision about their future, causing the Stellaron inside them to go berserk and kill the Doomsday Beast. The Trailblazer falters, unable to control the power within them, until Welt arrives and manages knock them unconscious with his Herrscher powers causing the Stellaron to become stable once again.

The Trailblazer later wakes up at the Space Station and Himeko introduces Herta to them, who later took an interest to the Trailblazer due the Stellaron inside their body. She later allows them to keep the Stellaron and to promise to visit Space Station again before Himeko offers the Trailblazer the chance to join the Astral Express in order to find Stellaron and find the answers they have been looking for, which they accept.

Development
Honkai: Star Rail entered its first closed beta testing on October 26, 2021, and ended testing on November 1, 2021. A second closed beta test was held on May 25, 2022, and ended testing on June 15, 2022. A final closed beta test was held on February 10, 2023. and prior to the release of the game.

Characters

Playable

Astral Express 
Himeko (JP: Tanaka Rie ; ENG: Cia Court)

An adventurous scientist who encountered the Astral Express as a child when it got stranded in her home world. Years later, when Himeko finally repaired the train and began her journey to the stars, but she realized this was only the beginning. On her trailblazing journey, she would need many more companions...And while they have different destinations, they all gaze at the same starry sky. 

Welt (JP: Hosoya Yoshimasa ; ENG: Corey Landis)

The wise and experienced former Anti-Entropy sovereign who inherits the name of the world, Welt. He has saved Earth from annihilation time and time again. After the incident with St. Fountain came to a close, Welt had no choice but to venture with the initiator of the incident to the other side of the portal. Perhaps even he did not expect the new journey nor companions that awaited him there. 

Dan Heng (JP: Ito Kent ; ENG: Nicholas Leung)

A cold a reserved young man who wields a spear called Cloud-Piercer. He acts as the Express's guard on its long trailblazing expedition. Dan Heng never talks much about his past. In fact, he joined the Express Crew to escape from it. But, can the Express really help him outrun his past? 

March 7th (JP: Ogura Yui ; ENG: Skyler Davenport)

A spirited, quirky young girl who is into all the things girls her age should be interested in, for example, taking photos. She was awakened from a piece of drifting eternal ice only to find out that she knows nothing about herself or her past. While initially in low spirits due to her lack of identity, she decided to name herself after the date she came into this new life. And thus, on that day March 7th was born.

Stellaron Hunters 
Kafka (JP: Itoh Shizuka ; ENG: Cheryl Texiera) 

On the Interastral Peace Corporation's wanted list, Kafka's entry only has two things; her name, and a single sentence, "Likes collecting coats." Little is known about this Stellaron Hunter, other than that she is one of Destiny's Slave Elio's most trusted member. In order to achieve Elio's envisioned future, Kafka gets to work. 

Silver Wolf (JP: Asumi Kana ; ENG: Melissa Fahn)

The universe is just another game to this super hacker. No matter how thorny the defense system, Silver Wolf can crack it with ease. Her hacking battle with Screwllum in the Genius Society has become stuff of legends in the hacking world. How many more levels are there to beat the universe? Silver Wolf looks forward to finding out.

Herta Space Station 
Arlan (JP: Shiraishi Ryoko ; ENG: Dani Chambers)

The inarticulate head of Herta Space Station's Security Department. While scientific research is beyond his understanding, Arlan is willing to risk his life to protect the staff who value research so very much. He is used to the pain and wears his scars like badges of honor. only when holding Peppy does the boy finally let down his guard and show a rare smile. 

Asta (JP: Akasaki Chinatsu ; ENG: Felicia Angelie)

a fiercely inquisitive and energetic young girl, she is the Lead Researcher of Herta Space Station. Whether it is managing opinionated staff, or courteously but firmly responding to the Intelligentsia Guild, Asta handles it all effortlessly. After all...commanding a space station is much easier than taking over my family business! 

Herta (JP: Yamazaki Haruka ; ENG: PJ Mattson)

Herta Space Station's true master. As the human with the highest IQ in The Blue, she only does what she's interested in, dropping whatever project immediately the moment she loses interest, the best example being the space station. She typically appears in the form of a ranged puppet. "It's about seventy percent similar to how I looked as a child." -Herta.

BELOBOG 
Gepard (JP: Furukawa Makoto ; ENG: Bryson Baugus) 

The honorable and upstanding captain of the Silvermane Guards who bears the noble Landau family name. in the frost-whipped city of Belobog, life can still go on in normality...This is no small part thanks to Gepard and his Silvermane Guards who protect the peace of everyday life. 

Bronya (JP: Asumi Kana ; ENG: Madeline Reiter) 

Heir to the Supreme Guardian of Belobog, she is the young and capable commander of the Silvermane Guards. Bronya received rigorous education from an early age, and possesses the grace and affinity as expected of the heir. However, after witnessing the abysmal conditions in the Underworld, seeds of doubt began growing in Belobog's future leader's mind. "Can all the training I've received really help me lead the people to lives they want?" 

Seele (JP: Nakahara Mai ; ENG: Molly Zhang) 

A spirited and valiant member of Wildfire who grew up in the perilous Underworld of Belobog. She is accustomed to being on her own. The protectors and the protected...the oppressors and the oppressed... The world Seele grew up knowing was just a simple dichotomy. That is, until "that girl" appeared. 

Clara (JP: Hidaka Rina & Yasumoto Hiroki ; ENG: Emily Sun & D.C Douglas) 

A young girl raised by a robot, her perceptiveness and tenacity are far beyond her years. For Clara, Svarog's logical calculations are law and infallible. That is, until she realized that the results from "calculations" don't always necessarily bring joy to everyone. The once shy little girl then decided to cast aside her timidness. 

Sampo Koski (JP: Hirakawa Daisuke ; ENG: Roger Rose)

A silver-tongued salesman, where there is profit to be made, you can be sure that Sampo is nearby. Sampo's unique knowledge makes it hard not to approach him for help, but becoming his "customer" isn't necessarily a good thing. After all, "customers" can turn into "commodities" for the right price. 

Pela (JP: Morohoshi Sumire ; ENG: Xanthe Huynh) 

The meticulous intelligence officer of the Silvermane Guards, while young, she is undeniably brilliant.

See also 
 Honkai Impact 3rd, another game in the Honkai series
 Houkai Gakuen 2, another game in the Honkai series
 Tears of Themis, another game by miHoYo
 Zenless Zone Zero, another game by HoYoverse
 Genshin Impact, another game by miHoYo

References

External links
 

Upcoming video games
IOS games
Windows games
Mobile games
Role-playing video games
Gacha games
Science fiction video games
Fantasy video games
Science fantasy video games
Space opera video games
Apocalyptic video games
Video games featuring protagonists of selectable gender
Video games developed in China
Free-to-play video games
MiHoYo games